The 1992 Virginia Slims of Los Angeles was a women's tennis tournament played on outdoor hard courts at the Manhattan Country Club in Manhattan Beach, California in the United States that was part of the Tier II category of the 1992 WTA Tour. It was the 19th edition of the tournament and was held from August 10 through August 16, 1992. Second-seeded Martina Navratilova won the singles title, her seventh at the event, and earned $70,000 first-prize money.

Finals

Singles
 Martina Navratilova defeated  Monica Seles 6–4, 6–2
 It was Navratilova's 3rd singles title of the year and the 160th of her career.

Doubles
 Arantxa Sánchez Vicario /  Helena Suková defeated  Zina Garrison-Jackson /  Pam Shriver 6–4, 6–2

References

External links
 ITF tournament edition details
 Tournament draws

Virginia Slims of Los Angeles
LA Women's Tennis Championships
Sports competitions in Manhattan Beach, California
Virginia Slims of Los Angeles
Virginia Slims of Los Angeles
Virginia Slims of Los Angeles
Virginia Slims of Los Angeles